The Malngin are an Aboriginal Australian people of the Kimberley region of Western Australia. The Malngin language was a dialect of Gurindj.

Country
Creek on the upper Ord River. Their north-northeastern extension ran to Lissadell, Rosewood, and the Argyle Downs. Their western boundaries lay around the eastern scarp of the Carr Boyd Range at Carlton Gorge. Their eastern reach ran only so far as the Ord River valley and the lower Negri River. The southern frontier was marked by the junction where the Nicholson River meets the Ord River.

Their neighbours were the Miriwung to their north, and running clockwise, on their eastern wing, in what is now the Northern Territory, were the Mariu. The Djaru lay directly south, and the Gija were along their western flank, with the border between the two running north along the track from Halls Creek to Wyndham.

Alternative names
 Malgin
 Malngjin

Source:

See also
Ngumpit, a name used by the Gurindji, Malngin, Bilinara, Mudburra and Ngarinyman peoples to refer to themselves as a group

Notes

Citations

Sources

Aboriginal peoples of Western Australia